The president of the United Arab Emirates, or the Raʾīs, is the head of state of the United Arab Emirates (UAE).

The president and vice-president are elected every five years by the Federal Supreme Council. Though the prime minister of the United Arab Emirates is formally appointed by the president, every UAE vice-president simultaneously serves as prime minister. Generally the ruler of the Emirate of Abu Dhabi holds the presidency and the ruler of the Emirate of Dubai holds the vice-presidency and premiership. The president is also the commander-in-chief of the UAE Armed Forces. 

Sheikh Zayed bin Sultan Al Nahyan was widely credited with unifying the seven emirates into one nation. He was the UAE's first president from the formation of the UAE until his death on 2 November 2004. He was succeeded by his son, Sheikh Khalifa bin Zayed, who died in office on 13 May 2022. Following his brother Khalifa's death, Sheikh Mohamed bin Zayed Al Nahyan was elected the third and current president of the UAE by the Federal Supreme Council on 14 May 2022.

List

Insignia

Timeline

See also
List of prime ministers of the United Arab Emirates

References

External links

Government of the United Arab Emirates
 
United Arab Emirates politics-related lists